The Prior of Coldingham was the head of the Benedictine monastic community of Coldingham Priory in Berwickshire. Coldingham Priory was founded in the reign of David I of Scotland, although his older brother and predecessor King Edgar of Scotland had granted the land of Coldingham to the Church of Durham in 1098, and a church was constructed by him and presented in 1100 AD. The first prior is on record by the year 1147, although an earlier foundation is almost certain. The monastic cell was a dependent of Durham until the 1370s, and in 1378 King Robert II of Scotland expelled the Durham monks; for the following century the cell had two priors, one chosen by Durham and one chosen by the Scots. It became a dependent of Dunfermline Abbey. It was subject to increasingly secular control from the late 15th century into the 16th century. The following is a list of priors and commendators:

List of priors

 Edward, fl. 1124 x 1153
 H.[...], fl. 1147 x 1150
 Sampson, fl. x 1159-1161 x 1162
 Alan, fl. 1165 x 1173
 Herbert, 1172x1174-1175
 Bertram, 1188-1189
 Simon, 1189 x 1203
 Radulf, x 1203-x 1207
 Ernald, x 1207-1208 x 1211
 Thomas, 1212-1221 x
 Radulf, 1218 x 1234
 Thomas de Melsonby, 1229-1234
 Anketin, 1239-1242
 Bertram de Mediltone, 1242 x 1244
 Richard, x 1245-1247 or 1248
 Henry de Sylton, 1248-1260
 German, 1260
 Roger de Wolviston, 1263-1274 x 1276
 Henry de Horncastre, 1276-1296
 William de Midilton, 1304
 William de Gretham, 1304-1305
 Adam de Pontefract, 1309-1311
 William de Gretham, 1311-1321
 Richard de Whitworth, 1322-1325
 Adam de Pontefract, 1325-1332
 Robert de Graystanes, 1333
 Alexander de Lamsley, 1334
 William de Scaccario, 1336 x 1337
 Alexander de Lamsley, 1338-1339
 John Fossour, 1340-1341
 Walter de Skaresbrekis, 1341-1354
 William de Bamburgh, 1355-1362
 Robert Berrington de Walworth, 1363-1374
 Robert de Claxton, 1374 x 1379

List of priors with allegiance to Durham

 Robert de Claxton, 1374-1391
 John de Ayclif, 1392-1416
 William Drax, 1418-1441
 John Oil, 1441-1447
 Thomas Nesbitt, 1447-1456
 John Pencher, 1456-1465 x 1467
 Thomas Haughton, 1467
 Thomas Wren, 1470

List of priors with allegiance to Dunfermline

 Adam de Carale, 1374 x 1379
 Michael de Inverkeithing, 1379-1389
 William Reid, 1389-1390
 Simon Marischal, 1389
 John Steele, 1390-1402
 Alan de Lyn, 1402
 Richard Mongal, 1402-1409
 Andrew Raburn, 1409-1414 x 1418
 Robert Bowmaker, 1419
 William Brown, 1419-1430
 Stephen Bryg, 1432
 William Boyce, 1442-1445

List of prior-commendators

 Patrick Home, 1461-1478
 John Home, 1464-1503
 Ninian Home, 1501-1508
 John Home, 1509
 Alexander Stewart, 1510-1513
 David Home, 1513-1517
 Thomas Nudre, 1514
 Robert Blackadder, 1518-1519
 William Douglas, 1519 -1526
 George Patricii, 1520
 Patrick Blackadder of Tulliallan, 1521 -1525
 Andrew Home, 1522
 John Forman, 1523
 Adam Blackadder, 1523-1541
 John Stewart, Commendator of Coldingham, 1541-1563
 Francis Stewart, earl of Bothwell, 1565-1567
 John Maitland, 1st Lord Maitland of Thirlestane, 1567-1571
 Alexander Home I [senior], 1570
 Alexander Home II [junior], 1571-1587
 Francis Stewart, earl of Bothwell (again), 1584-1590
 John Stewart, 1589-1592
 Alexander Home, 6th Lord Home, 1592-1606

Notes

References
 Cowan, Ian B. & Easson, David E., Medieval Religious Houses: Scotland With an Appendix on the Houses in the Isle of Man, Second Edition, (London, 1976), pp. 55–6
 Watt, D.E.R. & Shead, N.F. (eds.), The Heads of Religious Houses in Scotland from the 12th to the 16th Centuries, The Scottish Records Society, New Series, Volume 24, (Edinburgh, 2001), pp. 29–42

See also
 Coldingham
 Coldingham Priory
 Coldingham Bay
 Prior of Durham

Coldingham
Coldingham
Order of Saint Benedict